Charles Louis Boardman (March 27, 1893 – August 10, 1968) was an American Major League Baseball pitcher. He managed in the Dakota League in 1922 for the Valley City Hi-Liners.

References

1893 births
1968 deaths
Major League Baseball pitchers
Philadelphia Athletics players
Baseball players from New York (state)
Minor league baseball managers
Waterbury Contenders players
St. Paul Apostles players
Minneapolis Millers (baseball) players
Toledo Iron Men players
New Rockford-Carrington Twins players
Valley City Hi-Liners players
People from Seneca Falls, New York
Bismarck Capitals players